Rollie Krewson (sometimes credited as "Rollin Krewson") is a puppet designer and builder known for her work on various Muppet productions. She interned with Jim Henson's company in the mid-1970s. Although she now works primarily as a designer/builder, she began as a performer, doing small bits on The Muppet Show and other projects. 

She has contributed to almost every Henson production since her arrival, and to this day carries her skills through on Sesame Street. Krewson was the designer for Julia, Sesame's autistic Muppet character.

Krewson has received seven Daytime Emmy Awards for her contributions on Sesame Street and has been nominated many times for her work on other Henson productions.

Design credits
Sesame Beginnings - built Baby Elmo, Elmo's Dad 
Sesame English - built Tingo
Plaza Sesamo - built Lola and Pancho
The Adventures of Elmo in Grouchland (1999) - (Muppet builder/designer)
Muppets from Space (1999) - (project supervisor: Muppet workshop)
Big Bag - built Chelli
The Wubbulous World of Dr. Seuss - built Norval the Fish  Project Supervisor
Dog City (1993) - (Muppet workshop) (project supervisor) 
The Jim Henson Hour (1989) - built Lindbergh
The Christmas Toy (1986) - (Muppet design group) - built Rugby Tiger
Labyrinth (1986) - Creature workshop artist: The Wiseman, Alph and Ralph, Goblins
The Muppets Take Manhattan (1984) - (Muppets' studio coordinator)
Tale of the Bunny Picnic - built Twitch and Bean Bunny
Fraggle Rock (1983) - built Wembley, Red Fraggle, Balsam the Minstrel, others
The Dark Crystal (1982) - Creature design/Fabrication supervisor: Fizzgig
Emmet Otter's Jug-Band Christmas (1977) - built Wendel
The Muppet Show (1976) - Muppet designer/workshop supervisor; built Wayne and Wanda, Fozzie Bear's dummy Chuckie, Foo Foo and many others
Sesame Street (1969) - built Zoe, Curly Bear, Abby Cadabby, Lulu and many more; has built Elmo since 1988
Sisimpur  - built Halum, Shiku, Ikri-Mikri, Tuktuki 
Sesamstrasse - built Pferd
International Sesame Street Puppets for Russia, Germany, the Netherlands, South Africa, Bangladesh, India, Egypt, Japan and Indonesia

Performer credits
 The Muppet Show: Sex and Violence
 The Muppets Go to the Movies
 The Muppet Show - Mary Louise
 Labyrinth - Fiery 5 (assistant) 
 The Dark Crystal - Assistant puppeteer (Fizzgig, Kira, Garthim Master)
 Saturday Night Live - Assistant puppeteer

References

External links
 

1952 births
Living people
Muppet designers